Tikri Kalan is a Census Town city in West Delhi district in the Indian state of Delhi. It is located on the Delhi-Rohtak Road (National Highway 10). This place is dominated by the "Drall" Gotra of the Jat Community. This village gets its name from the Teka Drall

Khurd and Kalan are Persian words meaning small and large, respectively. They are used to distinguish Kalan (Big) villages from Khurd (Small) villages when the two are paired with the same name. *Drall* is the surname/Gotra of Jats living in the outskirts of Delhi and Haryana. Dharal found in Jats and Rajputs is branch of Bachak gotra.

School
Tikri is known as Delhi's best coaching centre called the Fourth Lord. It is located on the Delhi-Rohtak Road (National Highway 10). This place is dominated by the "Drall" Gotra of the Jat Community. This village gets its name from the Tika Drall.

Demographics
Some 3,455 houses abide there. As per Census India 2011, the town has a population of 16,313, of which 9,247 are males and 7,066 are females. The population of children aged 0–6 is 2,530, 15.51% of the total. Female Sex Ratio is at 764, lower than the state average of 868. Child Sex Ratio is around 831 compared to Delhi state average of 871. Literacy rate of Tikri Kalan city is 81.47%, lower than the state average of 86.21%. Male literacy is around 89.19% while the female literacy rate is at 71.21%.

Hindi is the local language.

Economy
5,728 people engage in work and business activity. Of the working population, 95.90% were engaged in main work while 4.10% were engaged in marginal work.

See also 

 Tikri Khurd

References

Neighbourhoods in Delhi
Cities and towns in West Delhi district